Colin Richardson (6 June 1920 – 22 December 1993) was an Australian cricketer. He played eight first-class matches for Tasmania between 1946 and 1951.

See also
 List of Tasmanian representative cricketers

References

External links
 

1920 births
1993 deaths
Australian cricketers
Tasmania cricketers
Cricketers from Hobart